The 1954 Asian Games, officially known as the Second Asian Games – Manila 1954 was a multi-sport event held in Manila, Philippines, from May 1 to 9, 1954. A total of 970 athletes from 19 Asian National Olympic Committees (NOCs) competed in 76 events from eight sports. The number of participating NOCs and athletes were larger than the previous Asian Games held in New Delhi in 1951.  This edition of the games has a different twist where it did not implement a medal tally system to determine the overall champion but a pointing system. The pointing system is a complex system where each athlete were given points according to their achievement like position in athletics or in swimming. In the end the pointing system showed to be worthless as it simply ranked the nations the same way in the medal tally system. The pointing system was not implemented in future games ever since. Jorge B. Vargas was the head of the Philippine Amateur Athletic Federation (In 1976, was renamed as Philippine Olympic Committee) and the Manila Asian Games Organizing Committee. With the second-place finish of the Philippines, only around 9,000 spectators attended the closing ceremony at the Rizal Memorial Stadium. The events were broadcast on radio live at DZRH and DZAQ-TV ABS-3 on delayed telecast.

Opening ceremony
The Games were formally opened by President Ramon Magsaysay on May 1, 1954, at 16:02 local time. Around 20,000 spectators filled the Rizal Memorial Stadium in Malate, Manila, for the opening ceremony. As requested by the IOC, the torch relay and lighting of the cauldron were excluded from the Opening Ceremony to preserve the tradition of the Olympic Games. The torch ceremony were returned at the 1958 Asian Games. The host however gave a solution by giving a special citation to the last athlete to enter the parade. The Philippines, as host, was the last country to enter the stadium. The flag bearer for the Philippines squad was Andres Franco, who won a gold medal in the 1951 Asian Games in high jump event, the sole gold medal of any Filipino in the athletics events of the previous Asian Games.

Sports

The 1954 Asian Games featured eight sports divided into 10 events, aquatics included three events namely diving, swimming and water polo. This version of the Asian Games comprised more sports and events than the last one, as six sports and seven events were in the calendar of 1951 Asian Games. Three sports—boxing, shooting and wrestling—made their debut, while cycling was dropped out.

Participating nations

National Olympic Committees (NOCs) are named and arranged according to their official IOC country codes and designations at the time.

Calendar
In the following calendar for the 1954 Asian Games, each blue box represents an event competition, such as a qualification round, on that day. The yellow boxes represent days during which medal-awarding finals for a sport were held. The numeral indicates the number of event finals for each sport held that day. On the left, the calendar lists each sport with events held during the Games, and at the right, how many gold medals were won in that sport. There is a key at the top of the calendar to aid the reader.

Medal table

Japan led the medal table, athletes from Japan won most medals, including most gold, silver and bronze. Host nation, Philippines finished second with 45 total medals (including 14 gold).

The top ten ranked NOCs at these Games are listed below. The host nation, Philippines, is highlighted.

References

 
Asian Games by year
Asian Games, 1954
Asian Games
Sports in Manila
Asian games
Multi-sport events in the Philippines
Asian Games
20th century in Manila
May 1954 sports events in Asia